Millennium software is business management software developed by the Parsippany, NJ-based company Millennium Systems International. Millennium is widely recognized as the leading business management software in the salon and spa industries, and is used by salons in over 36 countries, handling over $1 billion in revenue annually. Millennium has won many industry awards, including American Spa magazine's Professionals Choice Award for Best Software 8 years in a row, and the software has been featured on CNN, CNBC, VH1 and BRAVO.

Millennium Systems International is headquartered in Parsippany, NJ, with offices in Plymouth, Devon in the UK. John Harms is the company's founder and CEO.

History

Harms Software was founded by John Harms in 1987. Harms created Millennium software to help salons manage scheduling, record-keeping, and marketing, and the company eventually became focused on helping salons use the tool to grow their businesses.

As of 2013, the company operates offices in the US and the UK. Harms Software changed its name to Millennium Systems International in 2013.

Product

Millennium is the flagship product of Millennium Systems International. The business management and growth software is used by salons, spas, medical spas, studios and gyms to access business records, manage scheduling and point of sale transactions, track business goals, and generate and meet marketing goals. The software's features include:

 SMS and email appointment confirmations 
 Marketing reports on client data and trends
 Remote management tools 
 Loyalty program manager
 Online appointment scheduler
 Inventory management

Awards and recognition

Millennium has won several industry awards, including:

 The American Spa magazine's Professionals Choice Award for Best Software 8 years in a row
 Launchpad's Best Software System, Best Business Building Program, and Best Appointment Tracker awards – 2010, 2011, and 2012
 Behind the Chair Stylist Award for 2011, 2012, and 2013
 Salon Today Top 200 Most Leveraged Software 2012

External links
https://www.millenniumsi.com

References

Business software